Walter Julian Wright (November 20, 1908 – August 14, 1972), nicknamed "Bricktop", was an American professional basketball player and Negro league outfielder in the 1930s and 1940s.

A native of Savannah, Georgia, Wright attended Textile High School and Lincoln University. He played professional basketball throughout the 1930s and 1940s with such clubs as the New York Rens, Washington Bears, and New York Harlem Yankees, and served in the United States Army Air Corps during World War II.

In 1943, Wright played Negro league baseball for the New York Black Yankees. In 22 recorded games, he posted 12 hits in 78 plate appearances. Wright died in Southampton, New York in 1972 at age 63.

References

External links
 and Seamheads

1908 births
1972 deaths
New York Black Yankees players
New York Renaissance players
Baseball outfielders
Baseball players from Savannah, Georgia
Basketball players from Savannah, Georgia
United States Army personnel of World War II
20th-century African-American sportspeople
Burials at Long Island National Cemetery